Flaming Page (April 24, 1959 – 1984) was a Canadian Thoroughbred who was a Champion racehorse and then an outstanding broodmare. She is best known as the dam of English Triple Crown winner Nijinsky. She was elected to the Canadian Horse Racing Hall of Fame in 1980.

Background
Flaming Page was a bay mare bred in Canada by E. P. Taylor. She was sired by Bull Page, the 1951 Canadian Horse of the Year and a Canadian Horse Racing Hall of Fame inductee. Bull Page, who was also the sire of Canadian Hall of Famer New Providence, was an important early acquisition in Taylor's breeding enterprise. Despite his racing ability, Bull Page had soundness issues related to conformation defects that he passed on in varying degrees to his offspring.

Flaming Page was out of Flaring Top, a daughter of the 1937 American Champion Two-Year-Old Colt Menow. Flaring Top produced several other stakes winners and stakes producers including two-time American champion filly Doubledogdare.

Flaming Page grew into a large mare with a deep shoulder and a rangy build. She was sickle-hocked, a trait inherited from Bull Page. She raced under the colours of Taylor's Windfield Farm and was trained by Horatio Luro.

Racing career
As a two-year-old, Flaming Page had only two wins from seven starts, but one of those was the Shady Well Stakes at Woodbine and the other was an allowance race at Aqueduct in the United States. She also finished second in the Princess Elizabeth Stakes and third in the prestigious Coronation Futurity against colts. On the Canadian Free Handicap for two-year-olds, she was rated at 115 pounds, which tied her for first among fillies.

In 1962, Flaming Page started her three-year-old campaign in the United Stakes, where the highlight was a second-place finish in the Kentucky Oaks to future U.S. Racing Hall of Fame inductee Cicada. On returning to Canada, she won the Canadian Oaks (now known as the Woodbine Oaks), Canada's most prestigious race for three-year-old fillies. One week later, she faced the colts in the Queen's Plate, where she and stablemate Choperion ran one-two as the even money favorites. Flaming Page became the first filly to complete the Oaks-Plate double.

After the Queen's Plate, Flaming Page returned to the United Stakes where she suffered a career-ending injury in the Coaching Club American Oaks. Canada's leading money-earner in 1962 with $88,075, she was named the Canadian Champion three-year-old filly.

Breeding record

Flaming Page produced only three foals but even so would have a profound impact on the racing and breeding industry. Her first foal, born in 1964, was the filly Fleur, sired by Victoria Park. Fleur was a stakes-placed filly who became an outstanding producer. She is most famous for producing The Minstrel (by Northern Dancer), winner of the Epsom and Irish Derbies and King George VI and Queen Elizabeth Stakes and was 1977 Horse of the Year in England. Fleur also produced stakes winners Far North and Pilgrim, and stakes producer Dance Flower.

Flaming Page was the first mare mated with Northern Dancer when he retired to stud in 1965. She was so tall compared to him that a trench needed to be dug so he could complete the mating. That first colt was stillborn.

Flaming Page's next live foal, born in 1967, was the great Nijinsky, sired by Northern Dancer. Nijinsky, who physically resembled his dam, was England's first Triple Crown winner in 35 years and was named 1970 Horse of the Year in England. Nijinsky then became a Leading sire in Great Britain and Ireland and Leading broodmare sire in North America. Nijinsky was inducted into the Canadian Racing Hall of Fame in 1976.

Her final foal was Minsky, also sired by Northern Dancer, who became Ireland's champion 2-year-old colt in 1970. In 1969, Flaming Page suffered difficulties foaling another Northern Dancer colt, which subsequently died. Flaming Page was unable to conceive again and was retired in 1975. She died in 1984.

In 1980, Flaming Page was inducted into the Canadian Horse Racing Hall of Fame.

Pedigree

References

 Flaming Page's pedigree and partial racing stats

1959 racehorse births
1984 racehorse deaths
Racehorses bred in Ontario
Racehorses trained in Canada
King's Plate winners
Canadian Horse Racing Hall of Fame inductees
Thoroughbred family 8-f